Kalundborg is a Danish city with a population of 16,211 (1 January 2022), the main town of the municipality of the same name and the site of its municipal council.

Kalundborg is famous as the location of a large broadcasting facility, the Kalundborg Transmitter. The city was also home to the largest coal-fired power station in Denmark, the Asnæs Power Station, which started it's transition to biomass in 2017.

Kalundborg is mainly a trading and industrial town, but is also well known for its five-spired Church of Our Lady, which is closely associated with King Valdemar I and the Archbishop Absalon. The church itself is said to have been built by Absalon's brother, Esbern Snare.

Kalundborg is also the traditional seat of the aristocratic Lerche family. Their stately home, Lerchenborg, the best example of rococo architecture in Denmark, can be seen in the town's outskirts.

Ferries connect Kalundborg westward to the island of Samsø.

Geography

History
The Kalundborg area was first settled in 1170 at a natural harbour at the head of the narrow bay today known as Kalundborg Fjord. It became more urbanized during the nineteenth century and had grown into a major industrial centre by the mid-twentieth century.

Kalundborg Municipality has approximately 20,000 inhabitants, and its network is the most published example of Industrial Symbiosis. The history of Kalundborg Industrial Symbiosis activities began in 1961 when a project was developed and implemented to use surface water from Lake Tisso for a new oil refinery, to save the limited supplies of ground water. The City of Kalundborg took the responsibility for building the pipeline while the refinery financed it. Starting from this initial collaboration, a number of other collaborative projects were subsequently introduced and the number of partners gradually increased.

By the end of the 1980s, the partners realised that they had effectively "self-organised" into what is probably the best-known example of Industrial Symbiosis. The material exchanges in the Kalundborg region include: conservation of natural and financial resources; reduction in production, material, energy, insurance and treatment costs and liabilities; improved operating efficiency; quality control; improved health of the local population and public image; and realisation of potential income through the sale of by-products and waste materials.

Economy
Kalundborg Municipality is home to approximately 19,000 jobs of which 13,000 are in the private sector (December 2014). Novo Nordisk has extensive production facilities in Kalundborg with a total of more than 2,400 employees. Since 1999 they have invested more than DKK 7.5 billions in the complex. Pronova BioPharma Danmark, a bulk manufacturer of Omega-3 products which was acquired by BASF in 2014, also has a manufacturing plant in Kalundborg.

Port of Kalundborg
The port plays a central role in the town's economy. It is a municipal self-governing port with independent finances. Kalundborg Container Terminal is served by Unifeeder on a weekly basis. Schultz Shipping is a local shipping company. As of 2015, the port is being expanded with a new west harbor on the south side of the Asnæs peninsula.

Statoil Refining Denmark operates Denmark's largest oil refinery on the harbor with a capacity of 6.6 million ton oil products per year. Haldor Topsøe is one of the companies that has facilities at Kalundborg Tank Terminal.

Transportation

Rail

The Northwest Line (1874) and Kalundborg East (2018) connects Kalundborg with Holbæk and Roskilde and the rest of the Danish rail network. The eastern part of the town is also served by the railway halt Kalundborg East.

Notable people

Public Service & public thinking 

 Esbern Snare (1127–1204) a crusader; had built the Church of Our Lady, Kalundborg
 Christian II of Denmark (1481–1559 in Kalundborg Castle) monarch under the Kalmar Union
 Jørgen Bjelke (1621–1696 in Kalundborg) an exiled Norwegian officer and nobleman
 Sophie Amalie Lindenov (1649 in Kalundborg Castle–1688) noblewoman and landowner
 Hans Hagerup Gyldenpalm (1717–1781) a Danish born, Norwegian jurist and civil servant
 Arnoldus von Falkenskiold (1743–1819) a Danish military officer and landowner of Sæbygård
 Henrik Steffens Hagerup (1806–1859) a Norwegian naval officer and politician who served as Minister of the Navy
 Wilhelm Hellesen (1836–1892) inventor and industrialist; helped invent the dry cell battery
 Anne Elisabet Jensen (born 1951) a Danish politician and MEP
 Professor Claus Manniche (born 1956) a Danish rheumatologist, consultant and academic

The Arts 

 Johan Thomas Lundbye (1818–1848) a graphic artist and painter of animals and landscapes
 Elisabeth Dons (1864 in Bjergsted–1942) operatic mezzo-soprano at the Royal Danish Theatre
 Johannes Holbek (1872 in Årby–1903) a Danish painter and graphic artist
 Margrethe Lendrop (1873–1920) operatic soprano at the Royal Danish Theatre
 Sigrid Undset (1882–1949) a Norwegian novelist, awarded the Nobel Prize for Literature in 1928, emigrated to Norway aged 2
 Viggo Rørup (1903–1971) a Danish artist, joined the artists' colony the Odsherred Painters
 Thøger Birkeland (1922–2011) a teacher and writer, known for his children's books
 Søren Ulrik Thomsen (born 1956) a Danish poet; his debut was City Slang, 1981
 Frank Madsen (born 1962) a Danish author, illustrator and comics artist
 Christian E. Christiansen (born 1972) is a Danish filmmaker
 Jonas Poher Rasmussen, filmmaker

Sport 
 Mogens Guldberg (born 1963) a middle-distance runner, competed at the 1988 Summer Olympics
 Claus Nielsen (born 1964) a former footballer, almost 200 club caps and 14 for Denmark 
 Henrik Djernis (born 1968 in Svebølle) a Danish cyclist
 Thomas Damgaard (born 1971) a Danish former professional boxer 
 Anders Nielsen (born 1972) a Danish footballer, over 300 club caps
 Susanne Meyerhoff (born 1974) a Danish sport shooter, competed at the 1996, 2000 and 2004 Summer Olympics
 Thomas Frandsen (born 1976) a Danish former footballer, almost 300 club caps
 Jesper Hansen (born 1980) a Danish sport shooter, competed at the 2012, 2016 and 2020 Summer Olympics and finished 26th, 5th and 2nd in the Men's skeet. In 2013, he won the skeet shooting world championship.

Other
 Frida Schou (1891–1980), early businesswoman who ran the brick factory Knabstrup Teglværk from 1928

See also
 Nearby towns: Holbæk, Slagelse, Gørlev, Ruds Vedby, Jyderup, Svinninge, Roskilde.
 Nearby islands: Samsø, Sejerø, Funen (Fyn).
 Chronicle of the Expulsion of the Grayfriars#Chapter 14 Concerning the Friary at Kalundborg

Notes

References
 Denmark detailed roadmap, webpage: Tele-DK-Danmark.
 Ehrenfeld, J. and Gertler, N. (1997) 'Industrial Ecology in Practice: the evolution of interdependence at Kalundborg", Journal of Industrial Ecology, vol. 1, no. 1, pp. 67–80

External links

 
 Kalundborg municipality

 
Municipal seats of Region Zealand
Municipal seats of Denmark
Cities and towns in Region Zealand
Port cities and towns in Denmark
Kalundborg Municipality
1170 establishments in Europe
Populated places established in the 12th century